This is a list of crime films released in 1998.

References

1998